Dorylaimopsis is a genus of nematodes belonging to the family Comesomatidae.

The genus has cosmopolitan distribution.

Species:

Dorylaimopsis angelae 
Dorylaimopsis boucheri 
Dorylaimopsis brevispiculata 
Dorylaimopsis coomansi 
Dorylaimopsis euryonchus 
Dorylaimopsis gerardi 
Dorylaimopsis halongensis 
Dorylaimopsis hawaiiensis 
Dorylaimopsis heteroapophysis 
Dorylaimopsis intermedia 
Dorylaimopsis janetae 
Dorylaimopsis jinyuei 
Dorylaimopsis longispicula 
Dorylaimopsis magellanense 
Dorylaimopsis mediterranea 
Dorylaimopsis metatypica 
Dorylaimopsis nini 
Dorylaimopsis nodderi 
Dorylaimopsis papilla 
Dorylaimopsis peculiaris 
Dorylaimopsis pellucidum 
Dorylaimopsis perfecta 
Dorylaimopsis poriferum 
Dorylaimopsis punctata 
Dorylaimopsis rabalaisi 
Dorylaimopsis timmi 
Dorylaimopsis tumida 
Dorylaimopsis turneri 
Dorylaimopsis variabilis

References

Nematodes